Semiotus insignis is a species of beetle belonging to the family Elateridae.

Description
The basic colour of the body varies from fulvus to luteus. The head bears a small black spot on basal half. Pronotum has five black spots (four discal maculae and one located medially along the anterior margin). The elytra have a glabrous surface with fine striae and one spine on each apex.

Distribution
This species can be found in Mexico, Guatemala, Nicaragua, Costa Rica and Panama.

References
 Samuel A. Wells (2007) Natural History Museum of Los Angeles County
 Elateridae in SYNOPSIS OF THE DESCRIBED COLEOPTERA OF THE WORLD

Elateridae
Beetles of South America
Beetles described in 1857